Labeobarbus intermedius intermedius is the only subspecies of Labeobarbus intermedius.

References 

intermedius intermedius
Fish described in 1835